The  Aviation Museum of New Hampshire is a historical museum operated by the New Hampshire Aviation Historical Society, a non-profit group that preserves the history of flight in the U.S. state of New Hampshire. The organization's goal is to preserve New Hampshire aviation history through a series of dynamic and hands-on exhibits and programs, as the museum's website states. The museum operates in the 1937 Manchester Airport terminal building.  The museum expanded in 2011.

The museum offers an accredited aviation education class for New Hampshire high school students. The course has two goals, to help prepare students for college, and to offer a career-based program. The course offers six modules, and is based on the "Virtual Skies" NASA curriculum. This course is currently entirely funded by the museum through grants and donations. The museum also offers a school outreach program geared towards NH and MA students in grades K-8. The presentation is one hour, and includes video, interactive demonstrations, and hands-on paper airplane building and flying.

Hours of operation are Friday and Saturday, 10:00 a.m. - 4:00 p.m. and Sundays 1:00 - 4:00 p.m.

The museum exists alongside a runway at Manchester–Boston Regional Airport that parallels a portion of the now-defunct Manchester and Lawrence Railroad. It is housed in the 1937 terminal and control tower that was moved to the east side of the airport at 27 Navigator Road in Londonderry, New Hampshire.

Notable aviators from New Hampshire
 Laurence Carbee Craigie
 Rob Holland
 Gordon J. Humphrey
 Joseph C. McConnell
 Alan Shepard
 Harrison Thyng

References

External links

 
 New Hampshire Heritage Museum Trail

Aerospace museums in New Hampshire
Museums in Rockingham County, New Hampshire
Londonderry, New Hampshire